Gour Ghosh (17 November 1939 – 8 July 2017) was an Indian cricketer. He played first-class cricket for Bengal and Jharkhand.

See also
 List of Bengal cricketers

References

External links
 

1939 births
2017 deaths
Indian cricketers
Bengal cricketers
Jharkhand cricketers
Cricketers from Kolkata